Seweyo is a Guyana Defence Force (GDF) training camp located  up the Soesdyke-Linden Highway in Guyana.  It caters for all aspects of Skill at Arms and Ground Operations Training.

Seweyo training camp recently completed disaster relief training for GDF reservists.

References

Demerara-Mahaica
Guyanese Army installations